"Mountain Sound" is a single by the Icelandic indie folk/indie pop band Of Monsters and Men. The song was released as the second single from the international version of their debut studio album, My Head Is an Animal. It was written by Arnar Rósenkranz Hilmarsson, Nanna Bryndís Hilmarsdóttir and Ragnar Þórhallsson; and produced by Jacquire King.

Music video
The music video for  "Mountain Sound" was filmed on location at a festival held at the Hljomskalagardurinn park in Reykjavík, Iceland, on 7 July 2012. The band was filmed while performing at the festival. The video was first released onto YouTube on 14 September 2012 at a total length of four minutes.

Use in media
The song was used in the trailer of Alexander and the Terrible, Horrible, No Good, Very Bad Day. It can be heard in a bar in the fourth episode of the first season of Gang Related, "Perros".
It is also included as a playable song in Guitar Hero Live.

Lyric video
A lyric video was released in 2014 with the presence of the music video. The video features horses running through mountains and caves also shaped like horses.

Charts

Weekly charts

Year-end charts

Certifications

References

2012 singles
Of Monsters and Men songs
Song recordings produced by Jacquire King
Republic Records singles
2011 songs